Feeley Township is a township in Itasca County, Minnesota, United States. The population was 306 at the 2010 census.

Feeley Township was named for Thomas J. Feeley, a lumberman.

Geography

Demographics
As of the census of 2000, there were 327 people, 134 households, and 97 families residing in the township.  The population density was 10.4 people per square mile (4.0/km2).  There were 187 housing units at an average density of 5.9/sq mi (2.3/km2).  The racial makeup of the township was 100.00% White. Hispanic or Latino of any race were 0.31% of the population.

There were 134 households, out of which 27.6% had children under the age of 18 living with them, 66.4% were married couples living together, 3.0% had a female householder with no husband present, and 26.9% were non-families. 20.9% of all households were made up of individuals, and 9.7% had someone living alone who was 65 years of age or older.  The average household size was 2.44 and the average family size was 2.82.

In the township the population was spread out, with 21.1% under the age of 18, 6.1% from 18 to 24, 26.0% from 25 to 44, 25.1% from 45 to 64, and 21.7% who were 65 years of age or older.  The median age was 44 years. For every 100 females, there were 109.6 males.  For every 100 females age 18 and over, there were 118.6 males.

The median income for a household in the township was $40,625, and the median income for a family was $49,375. Males had a median income of $42,500 versus $19,375 for females. The per capita income for the township was $17,469.  About 5.9% of families and 10.4% of the population were below the poverty line, including 16.4% of those under age 18 and 11.1% of those age 65 or over.

References

Townships in Itasca County, Minnesota
Townships in Minnesota